Compsodrillia olssoni is a species of sea snail, a marine gastropod mollusk in the family Pseudomelatomidae, the turrids and allies.

Description
The length of the shell attains 23 mm.

Distribution
This species occurs in the Pacific Ocean from Panama to Ecuador

References

 McLean, J.H. & Poorman, R. (1971) New species of tropical Eastern Pacific Turridae. The Veliger, 14, 89–113

External links
 
 

olssoni
Gastropods described in 1971